Bryan Voke (born 7 June 1984) is a South African cricketer. He played in eight first-class and four List A matches for Border from 2007 to 2009.

See also
 List of Border representative cricketers

References

External links
 

1984 births
Living people
South African cricketers
Border cricketers
Cricketers from Cape Town